Telethusa (Ancient Greek: Τελέθουσα) was the Cretan mother of Iphis by Ligdus in Greek Mythology.

Mythology 
Telethusa was told by her husband Ligdus that if she gave birth to a girl, the child would be put to death. But when the child was about to be born Telethusa had a vision in her dreams in which Isis, in the company of other Egyptian gods (Anubis, Bubastis, Apis, Harpocrates and Osiris), told her not to obey her husband's orders. Doing as the vision said, Telethusa then raised her daughter Iphis as a boy to spare her from Ligdus's wrath. Iphis was later transformed into a man by the Egyptian goddess Isis in order to marry her true love, the maiden Ianthe.

Note

References 

 Publius Ovidius Naso, Metamorphoses translated by Brookes More (1859-1942). Boston, Cornhill Publishing Co. 1922. Online version at the Perseus Digital Library.
Publius Ovidius Naso, Metamorphoses. Hugo Magnus. Gotha (Germany). Friedr. Andr. Perthes. 1892. Latin text available at the Perseus Digital Library.

Women in Greek mythology
Cretan characters in Greek mythology